Bairnsdale Secondary College is a public co-educational secondary school located in Bairnsdale, Victoria, Australia. As of 2010 the school has approximately 1,100 students from Year 7 to year 12.

Music
Bairnsdale secondary college has 7 main bands consisting of the junior band, intermediate band, senior band, brass ensemble, swing band, string ensemble and senior string ensemble all performing locally and interstate every year. The once extensive music program was defunded in 2020, despite community protests.

History
Bairnsdale Secondary College opened its doors in 1912.

References

External links
Bairnsdale Secondary College website

Public high schools in Victoria (Australia)
Educational institutions established in 1912
Bairnsdale
1912 establishments in Australia